Torfinn Bentzen (1912–1986) was a Norwegian jurist and sports official.

He chaired the Norwegian Confederation of Sports from 1967 to 1973. He was a barrister by occupation.

References

1912 births
1986 deaths
Norwegian sports executives and administrators
20th-century Norwegian lawyers